Castlereagh  may refer to:

People
 Marquess of Londonderry, subsidiary title Viscount Castlereagh, used as courtesy title for the Marquess's eldest son; in particular
 Robert Stewart, Viscount Castlereagh (1769–1822), later 2nd Marquess of Londonderry: Anglo-Irish statesman and British Foreign Secretary.

Places
In Northern Ireland:
Castlereagh (borough), a local government district near Belfast
Castlereagh (County Down townland) which gives its name to the borough
 Castlereagh (County Down barony), latterly divided into
 Castlereagh Upper and 
 Castlereagh Lower

In the Republic of Ireland:
 County Mayo: townlands in two baronies:
 Castlereagh, Clanmorris, Crossboyne parish
 Castlereagh, Tirawley, Killala parish
 Castlereagh, County Offaly, townland in Lemanaghan parish, Garrycastle barony
 County Roscommon:
 Castlerea, town 
 Castlereagh (County Roscommon barony), around the town
 Castlereagh (County Roscommon townland), townland around the town
 Castlereagh, County Waterford, townland in Kilronan parish, Glenahiry barony

In Australia:
Castlereagh, New South Wales, a suburb of Sydney
Castlereagh River, two rivers
Castlereagh Highway, a New South Wales state highway
Castlereagh Street, a street in CBD Sydney

Other places:
Castlereagh, Nova Scotia, a former village on the Bass River in Nova Scotia, Canada
Castlereagh Dam and Reservoir, in Nuwara Eliya district, Sri Lanka

Other uses
 The Castlereagh (Gilgandra), an early-20th-century newspaper in New South Wales, Australia